Marianna Csörnyei (born October 8, 1975 in Budapest) is a Hungarian mathematician who works as a professor at the University of Chicago. She does research in real analysis, geometric measure theory, and geometric nonlinear functional analysis. She proved the equivalence of the zero measure notions of infinite dimensional Banach spaces.

Education and career
Csörnyei received her doctorate from Eötvös Loránd University in 1999, supervised by György Petruska. She was a professor at the Mathematics Department of University College London between 1999–2011, and spent the 2009–2010 academic year at Yale University as visiting professor. Currently, she is at the University of Chicago.

She is contributing editor of the mathematical journal Real Analysis Exchange.

Awards and honors
Csörnyei won a 2002 Whitehead Prize from the London Mathematical Society and a Royal Society Wolfson Research Merit Award that same year.
She was also awarded the Philip Leverhulme Prize for Mathematics and Statistics in 2008 for her work in geometric measure theory.

She was an invited sectional speaker at the International Congress of Mathematicians, in 2010.

Csörnyei was selected to deliver the AWM-AMS Noether Lecture at the 2022 Joint Mathematics Meetings in Seattle, Washington. The title of her talk is The Kakeya needle problem for rectifiable sets.

She is included in a deck of playing cards featuring notable women mathematicians published by the Association of Women in Mathematics.

External links
Csörnyei's faculty page at the University of Chicago

References

1975 births
Living people
21st-century Hungarian mathematicians
21st-century women mathematicians
Mathematical analysts
Academics of University College London
Royal Society Wolfson Research Merit Award holders
Whitehead Prize winners
University of Chicago faculty